Sunnyside is a rural locality in the local government area (LGA) of Kentish in the North-west and west LGA region of Tasmania. The 2016 census recorded a population of 104 for the state suburb of Sunnyside.

History 
Sunnyside was gazetted as a locality in 1957.

Geography
Most of the boundaries are survey lines.

Road infrastructure 
Route B13 (Railton Road) runs along the north-east boundary. From there, Maloneys Road and Sunnyside Road provide access to the locality.

References

Towns in Tasmania
Localities of Kentish Council